The 53rd Infantry Brigade Combat Team is an infantry brigade combat team of the Florida Army National Guard. The 53rd Infantry Brigade is the largest National Guard unit in the state of Florida. The brigade was one of fifteen enhanced readiness brigades, designed and trained to support active duty divisions. The brigade includes 32 units in Florida and Alabama with 4,166 authorized personnel.

History

Cold War and 1990s 
When the 48th Armored Division was disbanded in 1968, its units in Florida became part of the 53rd Infantry Brigade (Separate). The distinctive unit insignia was originally approved for the non-color bearing units of the 53d Armored Brigade on 9 January 1967. It was redesignated for the 53d Infantry Brigade on 25 July 1968.

The brigade participated in hurricane relief operations in 1992 in response to Hurricane Andrew whereby the brigade was deployed for nearly two months to Miami.

The Florida Army National Guard 53rd Infantry Brigade was the first of fifteen Army National Guard enhanced readiness brigades to rotate through the Joint Readiness Training Center (JRTC) at Fort Polk, Louisiana, 10–26 June 1995. Participating in the training were 65 per cent of the Florida Army National Guard. A convoy of 1,000 vehicles traveled from Miami to Panama City, Florida to be loaded on barges and shipped to Fort Polk for the National Guard Brigade training. The brigade also has a training relationship with the 82nd Airborne Division.

The U.S. Army has since eliminated the "Enhanced Brigade" program of directly augmenting active duty combat arms units with Army National Guard units.

War on Terror (2001 - 2021)

Iraq 2003 
The brigade's three infantry battalions were activated in late December 2002 and sent to Fort Stewart, Georgia for training.

Following training at Fort Stewart, the three infantry battalions (1st, 2nd, and 3rd Battalions, 124th Infantry Regiment) deployed to the Persian Gulf in support of Operation Iraqi Freedom, assumed a physical security mission on the Jordan-Iraq border.  Following thirty-eight days of pre-mobilization training at Fort Stewart, GA, the Miami-based 1st Battalion, 124th Infantry Regiment, under the command of Lieutenant Colonel Hector Mirable deployed to Jordan where it initially served as the security force at Prince Hassan Air Base, a forward operating base for U.S. Special Operations Forces and A-10 Thunderbolt II attack aircraft of the United States Air Force.

In late April 2003, the battalion was attached to the 3rd Armored Cavalry Regiment and deployed into Iraq by air and ground assault convoy. After consolidation at Al Asad Air Base, Iraq, it moved to Ar Ramadi, the provincial capital of Al Anbar Province, where it was assigned an area of operation consisting of approximately 2,400 square kilometers and more than 350,000 Sunni Iraqi inhabitants.

While there, they provided local security and assisted in the reestablishment of the Iraqi Police and Ministerial Guard forces. The unit also conducted cordon and search operations. During one of these sweeps through the outskirts of Ar Ramadi on 20 August 2003, members of the 1–124 Infantry captured Salem Musa Ijly. Also known as Abu Inas, Ijly was a Jordanian national and member of al-Qaida, who was facilitating weapons smuggling through Iraq into Jordan and maintaining weapons stockpiles in Ar Ramadi. He was also linked to a plot to assassinate King Abdullah II of Jordan.

During its deployment, the battalion captured 511 enemy combatants; recovered 2,399 small arms, 221 mortar tubes, 4,258 mortar round and 43 RPG launchers; captured, defused or engaged 715 improvised explosive devices; processed 7,422 detainees; and, disbursed more than $1.3 million in aid for repair or construction of numerous buildings, to include two hospitals, 67 schools and 52 mosques.

The 1–124 Infantry received the Valorous Unit Award for extraordinary heroism in operations. Soldiers of the unit were presented 65 Bronze Stars (two with "V" device), 379 Army Commendation Medals (13 with "V" device), and 63 Purple Hearts. Despite serving 291 continuous days in combat operations, the unit brought home every Soldier who deployed with it.

The Orlando-based 2nd Battalion, 124th infantry Regiment, deployed along the southern Iraq border and a 20-man detachment from Charlie Company, 2–124th was the first coalition unit into Iraq, providing security and quick-reaction force for Special Forces. During their brief stay at the Jordanian Air Base, the unit conducted security operations, physical fitness training, and honed their combat skills.

Afghanistan 2005–2006 and Iraq 2006–2007 
In 2005, more than 2,400 soldiers from the 53rd Infantry Brigade deployed to Afghanistan as part of the international coalition's Joint Task Force Phoenix, where they helped train the Afghan National Army. During their deployment, the task force saw eleven Afghan kandaks (battalions) graduate from Kabul Military Training Center, adding more than 7,000 soldiers to the Afghan National Army.

In June 2006, Delta Company, 2nd Battalion, 124th Infantry deployed to Mosul, Iraq for a one-year tour conducting stability operations and combat patrols. The unit worked in conjunction with elements of the 25th Infantry Division, United States Special Forces, and Company H, 121st LRRS.

Kuwait and Iraq 2010 
In January 2010, the 53rd Infantry Brigade was activated for service in Kuwait and Iraq in support of Operation Iraqi Freedom. The brigade mobilized at Fort Hood, Texas, and beginning in late February, began deploying to Kuwait. Although originally scheduled for deployment to Afghanistan in 2009, in 2008, the brigade learned that their mission had shifted from Infantry operations in Afghanistan to convoy security in Iraq.

The brigade's primary mission was to provide convoy security for logistical convoys moving in and out of Iraq. The 1st Battalion, 124th Infantry – the Hurricane Battalion – conducted medium and long haul missions from their base in Camp Buehring, Kuwait, while the 2nd Battalion, 124th Infantry – the Seminole Battalion – conducted short haul missions from their base in Camp Virginia, Kuwait. The 1st Squadron, 153rd Cavalry "Darkhorse" conducted security force missions in Northern Kuwait at Camps Buehring and Virginia as well as at Khabari Crossing in Kuwait.  Bravo Troop, 1–153rd Cavalry was stationed at Camp As-Sayliyah, Qatar. The brigade headquarters element conducted administrative operations from Camp Arifjan, Kuwait.

In a ceremony on 5 November 2016, the 1st Battalion, 167th Infantry Regiment of the Alabama Army National Guard was re-patched to denote its attachment to the 53rd IBCT.

2020 and beyond 

In November 2021, 160 soldiers of the 53rd IBCT, to include the brigade commander, were mobilized to active duty under Title 10 USC orders and forward deployed to Ukraine to advise and mentor Ukrainian military forces as part of Joint Multinational Training Group - Ukraine.  In this capacity, the 53rd IBCT element was named Task Force Gator.  In early February 2022, just prior to the 2022 Russian invasion of Ukraine, the 53rd IBCT element was ordered out of Ukraine by Secretary of Defense Lloyd Austin and repositioned elsewhere in Western Europe, continuing a training mission with NATO partner nations.  In August 2022, the Task Force Gator element of the 53rd IBCT returned home to Florida and demobilized back to traditional National Guard status.

Order of battle
The 53rd Infantry Brigade Combat Team is headquartered at the C. W. "Bill" Young Armed Forces Reserve Center in Pinellas Park, Florida and consists of three infantry battalions, a cavalry squadron, a field artillery battalion, a brigade engineer battalion, and a brigade support battalion which are located in both Florida and Alabama: 
 1st Battalion, 124th Infantry Regiment
Headquarters and Headquarters Company (HHC) – Miramar, Florida
Company A – Ft. Pierce, Florida
Company B – Cocoa, Florida
Company C – Miami, Florida
Company D – West Palm Beach, Florida
 2nd Battalion, 124th Infantry Regiment
HHC – Orlando, Florida
Company A – Leesburg, Florida
Company B – Sanford, Florida
Company C – Ocala, Florida
Company D – Eustis, Florida
 1st Battalion, 167th Infantry Regiment
HHC – Talladega, Alabama
Company A – Tuscaloosa, Alabama
Company B – Pelham, Alabama
Company C – Cullman, Alabama
Company D – Calera, Alabama
Forward Support Company – Oxford, Alabama
 1st Squadron Reconnaissance Surveillance and Target Acquisition (RSTA), 153rd Cavalry Regiment
Headquarters and Headquarters Troop – Panama City, Florida
Troop A – Bonifay, Florida
Troop B – Pensacola, Florida
Troop C – Tallahassee, Florida
 2nd Battalion, 116th Field Artillery Regiment
Headquarters and Headquarters Battery – Lakeland, Florida
Battery A – Dade City, Florida
Battery B – Winter Haven, Florida
Battery C – Ocala, Florida
 753rd Brigade Engineer Battalion
HHC – Tallahassee, Florida
Company A (Engineer) – Lake City, Florida
Company B (Engineer) – Quincy, Florida
Company C (Signal Network Support) – Pinellas Park, Florida
Company D (Military Intelligence) – Pinellas Park, Florida
Detachment 1, Company D (Unmanned Aerial Systems) – Camp Blanding, Florida
 53rd Brigade Support Battalion
HHC – St. Petersburg, Florida
Company A (Distribution) – Pinellas Park, Florida
Company B (Maintenance) – Tampa, Florida
Company C (Medical) – Pinellas Park, Florida
Company D (Forward Support) – (1-153rd Cavalry Squadron) – Chipley, Florida
Company E (Forward Support) – (753rd Engineer Battalion) – Quincy, Florida
Company F (Forward Support) – (2-116th Field Artillery Battalion) – Bartow, Florida
Company G (Forward Support) – (1-124th Infantry Battalion) – Miramar, Florida
Company H (Forward Support) – (2-124th Infantry Battalion) – Haines City, Florida

References

External links
 The Institute of Heraldry: 53rd infantry Brigade

Infantry 999 053
Infantry 999 053
Infantry 999 053
Military units and formations in Florida
Military units and formations established in 1968